Bellvue  is an unincorporated community and U.S. Post Office in Larimer County, Colorado.  It is a small agricultural community located in Pleasant Valley, a narrow valley just northwest of Fort Collins near the mouth of the Poudre Canyon between the Dakota Hogback ridge and the foothills of the Rocky Mountains.  The ZIP Code of the Bellvue Post Office is 80512.

Description
The community is lush area on the south side of the Cache la Poudre River, at the mouth of Rist Canyon, concealed from the open Colorado Piedmont near Fort Collins and LaPorte by the Bellvue Dome, also known as "Goat Hill". The valley formerly stretched southward between the hogback and foothills into the area now inundated by Horsetooth Reservoir. The main agriculture in the valley is cultivation of hay and other crops, as well as cattle and horse ranches. The Colorado Division of Wildlife maintains a large trout hatchery in the valley just north of the Bellvue town site.

History
Paleoindian sites nearby, including a large bison kill site along the Poudre River, indicate human habitation dating back over 10,000 years. In the early 19th century, the area was inhabited by bands of Arapaho, who clashed regularly in small skirmishes with bands of the Ute tribe who inhabited the mountains. Archaeological remains of teepee rings can be found in the surrounding foothills.

The first white settlers arrived in the valley soon after Antoine Janis became the first white settler in northern Colorado in 1858. The farm and pasture lands were squatted upon in the two years that followed, so that most was claimed by G.R. Sanderson, one of these first settlers, who built the first irrigation ditch in the county in June 1860. The ditch was the second one constructed in northern Colorado. Sanderson sold his claim to J.H. Yeager in 1864, and the ditch came to be known as the Yeager ditch.

Another early settler, Samuel Bingham, settled on the west slope of Bingham Hill in 1860. In 1860, Abner Loomis, who was also an early prominent resident of Fort Collins, settled on a ranch in the valley. Other early settlers in the 1860s included Benjamin T. Whedbee, Perry J. Bosworth, C.W. Harrington, and Louis Blackstock.

In 1873, Jacob Flowers arrived in the valley and set up a homestead on a parcel of land he purchased from Joseph Mason. Flowers had migrated westward from Ohio and Missouri after the Civil War and had settled temporarily in Greeley in 1872. The following year, Flowers followed the Poudre upstream and founded the town of "Bellevue" later that year (the name was later shortened).

The area was considered desirable by the Union Pacific Railroad because of the many stone quarries in the area near the town of Stout (now flooded by Horsetooth Reservoir). The influx of railroad workers to work the quarries prompted Flowers to open a general store, saloon, barber shop, and post office. In 1880 he built a one-story sandstone structure to house his business.  The Bellvue Post Office opened in the building on June 24, 1884.  The building served as the local general store and post office up through the middle 20th century, when it became the meeting house of Cache la Poudre Grange, Chapter 456 of the Colorado State grange, a designation for which it is now commonly known.

Flowers also constructed a track and bandstand south of town that was used for horse racing, community celebrations, traveling medicine shows, and dog and pony shows.

Geography
Bellvue is located at  (40.625679,-105.171089).

See also

Outline of Colorado
Index of Colorado-related articles
State of Colorado
Colorado cities and towns
Colorado counties
Larimer County, Colorado
Colorado metropolitan areas
Front Range Urban Corridor
North Central Colorado Urban Area
Fort Collins-Loveland, CO Metropolitan Statistical Area

References

External links

History of Larimer County, Colorado, Ansel Watrous (1911).

Unincorporated communities in Larimer County, Colorado
Unincorporated communities in Colorado